West Energy Ltd. is a Canadian energy exploration company that operates mainly in Western Canada. West is notable for its focus on the Nisku area, as well as its high success rate in terms of finding and drilling wells successfully.

Overview

West was incorporated in December 2002, and went public on October 8, 2004. West has, to date, participated in the drilling of numerous wells and holds interest in a vast amount of land.  Since going public, West's shares have quintupled in price, as of January 2007.

In March 2010, it was announced that Daylight Resources Trust will acquire West Energy.

Management team

Ken McCagherty - President, CEO
Rick Jaggard - VP of Finance and CFO
Jack Lane - VP of Operations
Chris Bennett - VP of Land and Contracts
Graeme Bloy - VP of Operations

Board of directors
Ken McCagherty- CEO and President
Bruce Chernoff
Keith MacDonald
Larry Evans
Keith Greenfield - Corporate Secretary

References

External links

West Financial Reports

Companies based in Calgary
Oil companies of Canada